Chinese reforms or Chinese reform may refer to a number of events from Chinese history: 

Hundred Days' Reform, failed Qing dynasty reforms in the 1898
Chinese economic reform, a variety of economic reforms in China beginning in the 1940s
Thought reform in China, Chinese campaign focused on the acceptance of Marxism–Leninism in the 1950s
Healthcare reform in China, reforms to the Chinese healthcare system
2020–2021 Xi Jinping Administration reform spree, ongoing reforms to the economy and culture of China by the Chinese Communist Party